The 1991 Australian Football League finals series was the 95th annual edition of the VFL/AFL final series, the Australian rules football play-off tournament staged to determine the winner of the 1991 AFL Premiership season. The series ran over four weekends in September 1991, culminating with the 1991 AFL Grand Final at AFL Park on 28 September 1991.

The McIntyre final five system, which had operated from 1972 until 1990, was replaced by the first McIntyre final six system. The following season, it was replaced by the second McIntyre final six system.

Bracket

Venues
In terms of venues, the 1991 AFL finals series was historically significant for two reasons. First, due to ongoing construction of the Great Southern Stand at the MCG, all but one of the matches of the 1991 AFL finals series were contested at Waverley Park. This was the first time since 1945 that a VFL/AFL finals series was not played at the MCG. Second, the Qualifying final at Subiaco Oval marked the first time a VFL/AFL final had been played outside of Victoria.

Week one (qualifying and elimination finals)

First Elimination final (Melbourne vs Essendon)
The opening match of the 1991 AFL finals series saw fifth-placed  play sixth-placed  in the First Elimination final at Waverley Park. This marked the 14th VFL/AFL final between the two clubs, having previously met in the 1959 VFL Grand Final, which was won by Melbourne. They had also met in Grand Finals in 1941, 1946, 1948 (with the third game resulting in the first drawn VFL Grand Final) and 1957, with Melbourne winning all except the 1946 decider.

Teams

Essendon lost Salmon before the match with groin and ankle strains, and was replaced in the side by Peter Somerville. There were no late changes to the Melbourne team.

Match summary
After Essendon had the better of the first half, Melbourne kicked thirteen goals to four in the second half to advance to the first semi-final. Allen Jakovich was on fire for the Demons with eight goals.

Scorecard

Second Elimination final (Geelong vs St Kilda)
The Second Elimination final saw third placed  play fourth placed  at Waverley Park. Grand finalists two seasons prior, the Cats bounced back from a disappointing 1990, jumping into the Top Six after an important 40-point win against Hawthorn in Round 12 and spending much of the latter half of the season in second place behind West Coast. The Saints were the feel-good story of 1991, putting a difficult decade behind them and qualifying for their first VFL/AFL finals series since 1973. This was the second VFL/AFL final between the two clubs, having previously met in the 1968 First Semi-final, which was won by Geelong.

Teams
Geelong made some late changes to its team, as Damian Bourke (calf injury) and Tim Darcy (sore ankle) were ruled unavailable; their places were taken by Stephen Hooper and Mark Neeld. There were no late changes for St Kilda. The Cats still boasted a number of players in their team from the 1989 VFL Grand Final, while the Saints had only three players in their team with finals experience: Russell Morris, Stephen Newport and Tim Pekin.

Match summary
Although Geelong had opted to kick with the wind first, it was St Kilda who opened the scoring, to the delight of their long-suffering supporters. After three misses, Gilbert McAdam kicked truly on the run from 40 metres at the 9-minute mark. Frank Coghlan and Tony Lockett added further majors soon after to push the Saints' lead to 21 points at the 12-minute mark, with the Cats still not having registered a score.
Bill Brownless finally got Geelong on the scoreboard at the 14-minute mark, with a long set shot resulting in a behind. However, Russell Morris' short kick-in did not reach Lazar Vidovic in the back pocket, and the resulting pressure allowed Sean Denham to swoop on the ball and score the Cats' first goal from a tight angle. After the slow start, Geelong's midfield took control and with quick goals to Brownless (two) and veteran Neville Bruns, the Cats had seized the lead at the 18-minute mark. Lockett then had two chances to regain the lead for St Kilda but missed both set shots, the second one from barely ten metres. He would later blame himself for the Saints' loss. Soon after, Brownless added his third for the quarter to give Geelong a ten-point lead at the first change.

In the second quarter, the Saints took full advantage of the breeze, kicking six unanswered goals to open up a 26-point lead. As in the opening term, McAdam kicked the first goal before Lockett went on a rampage, booting the next five goals - it would have been six if he had marked in the goal square from another brilliant pass by Nicky Winmar - before Garry Hocking slammed through a much-needed goal for Geelong at the 27-minute mark. When the siren sounded for the main break several minutes later, the Saints held a 19-point lead.

In a wonderful clash, the Cats held out in the last quarter.

Scorecard

Qualifying Final (West Coast vs Hawthorn)
The Qualifying Final saw minor premier  host second-placed  at Subiaco Oval. Not only was it the first VFL/AFL final to be played outside of Victoria, it was also the first time the two clubs had met in a VFL/AFL final. The Hawks had qualified for their tenth consecutive VFL/AFL finals series, while the Eagles had built on their third-placed finish in 1990 and won the first 12 games of 1991 to eventually finish three games clear on top of the ladder. The sides had met twice during the season - in Round 7 at Princes Park and Round 22 at Subiaco Oval - with West Coast winning both games. The build-up of excitement during the week leading up to the match resulted in Perth being dubbed 'Eagle City'.

Teams

Match summary

Scorecard

Week two (Semi-finals)

First Semi-final (West Coast v Melbourne)
The First Semi-final saw West Coast travel to Waverley to host Melbourne on Sunday 15 September. This was the third time both sides had met in a final, with the ledger standing at one win each. It was also the second consecutive year the two teams had met in the first semi-final.

Teams

Match summary
Again, it was a step too far for Melbourne, with the Eagles winning comfortably.

Scorecard

Second Semi-final (Hawthorn v Geelong)
The Second Semi-final saw Hawthorn host Geelong at AFL Park on Saturday 14 September. This was the fourth finals meeting between both sides, with Geelong holding a 2-1 advantage. Their previous finals meeting was the unforgettable 1989 VFL Grand Final, which Hawthorn had won by six points. During the 1991 AFL season, the two sides had met in Round 12, with Geelong emerging victorious by 40 points.

Teams

Hawthorn made only one change to the team that had beaten West Coast, with Hall in for the injured Brereton.

Match summary
The match took place in perfect conditions. Hawthorn were playing with a slight breeze advantage, and in an eventful first quarter, Hall kicked the Hawks' first two goals before being stretchered off at the 20-minute mark of the term when Hinkley hit him with an elbow to the back of the head after Hinkley had handpassed the ball. Although not reported at the time of the incident, the AFL Tribunal would later suspend Hinkley for three weeks using trial by video. Hawthorn's wasteful accuracy in front of goal threatened to undo its good work around the ground; only one goal had been generated from their first six scoring shots before former captain and veteran midfielder Bruns kicked Geelong's first goal against the run of play. Moments later, key forward Brownless was reported by field umpire Dore for striking Hawthorn captain Tuck with what appeared an innocuous clip around the collarbone area. The Cats closed the margin to four points when Garry Hocking finished off a desperate passage of play with a left-foot snap, but thereafter the Hawks controlled the rest of the quarter. Again their poor finishing let them down, only adding one more goal through Hudson and six further behinds to take a 16-point lead into the first change.
Geelong struggled to make inroads in the second quarter as Hawthorn went into the main break having extended their advantage by a mere point. Hudson had a chance just before the siren to extend the lead to 23 points, but his set shot sailed out of bounds. Brownless had kicked two of the Cats' three goals in the quarter but was clearly hampered by hamstring problems. With Ablett out suspended, Geelong's coaching staff were forced to make a number of positional changes to rectify their problems in attack. 
The Cats were first on the scoreboard in the second half when Garry Hocking kicked his second goal at the 3-minute mark. He had just taken a running shot at goal which had missed, but was pushed in the back after his kick by Allan, and duly converted the subsequent free kick. Hawthorn replied when Dear kicked his second goal after five minutes of end-to-end action, but with Bairstow and Poole starting to get their hands on the ball and send it repeatedly into attack with long kicks, Geelong finally managed to string together successive goals. When the versatile Stoneham took a juggling mark and kicked truly at the 15-minute mark, the Cats had taken the lead for the first time that afternoon. Brownless, who had struggled with hamstring problems for several months and had been labouring against Langford, finally hobbled off and would not return. Hawthorn regained the lead when Dunstall, well held by Rogers, kicked his first goal, but the Cats answered quickly through goals to the lively Neeld and Bruns to lead by eight points. But the battle-hardened Hawks hit back when Dunstall and Robran goaled against the run of play to level the scores. Mansfield's set shot after the siren drifted wide to give Geelong a one-point lead at the last change.  
The final term was a tense and physical affair. Hawthorn took back the lead through goals to Dunstall and Pritchard. The game was then held up for several minutes, as Hinkley was stretchered off with concussion and a broken nose after being sandwiched in a marking contest which resulted in the Pritchard goal. Geelong captain Bews, who had just come off with a suspected broken hand, was forced to return to the field. It was the Cats' turn to struggle in front of goal, kicking five behinds before Neeld snapped his third at the 19-minute mark to narrow the margin to two points. Meanwhile, Hawthorn was also having injury problems, with Pritchard limping and Mew slightly groggy after a collision with teammate Ayres. With time-on approaching, the Hawks gained breathing space when Jarman snapped an amazing goal from a tight angle, but a near-instant reply from Mansfield brought the margin back to one point with seven minutes remaining. The suspense in time-on was almost unbearable, with Geelong trying to regain the lead and Hawthorn holding on grimly. The Cats had a final chance when Poole found space to run with the ball and kick it long towards goal, only for the Hawthorn defence to rush a behind. A minute later, the final siren sounded with the Hawks ahead by two points, sending them straight through to the grand final and gaining a much-needed week's rest.
Relieved Hawthorn coach Alan Joyce praised his side's effort:

"They had to be at their full in every department and to their credit they did enough to win. We have got a fortnight to prepare for the grand final and that's what we set out to achieve."

Geelong coach Malcolm Blight was disappointed with a number of players who had faltered under finals pressure:

"There's a few blokes today who should have a good look at the way they play footy and the way they approach their football. That's what finals are [about]; trying to find out what you're made of.""

Scorecard

Week three (Preliminary final)
The Preliminary final saw  return to Waverley to host  on Saturday 21 September. This was the first final between the two sides.

Teams

After half-jokingly suggesting fifteen changes following Geelong's two-point loss the previous week, Blight ended up making only four changes to the side; two were forced, with Hinkley (three weeks) and Brownless (one week) suspended, while Denham and Simpson were dropped, replaced by Christensen, Hooper, Merriman and Scott. For West Coast, David Hynes was a late withdrawal and replaced with Adrian Barich. There were no late changes for the Cats.

Match summary 
In complete contrast to the previous week, this game was played in cold, wet and windy conditions, and the poor visibility meant the stadium floodlights had to be turned on ten minutes into the first quarter. Kicking against the wind, Geelong managed to score first through Stoneham and hold West Coast goalless until nearly the 15-minute mark. With Jakovich starting to win more ruck contests, the Eagles suddenly turned the game on its head, kicking three goals in as many minutes to go into the first break with a 22-point lead. Geelong coach Malcolm Blight would later label that moment the turning point of the game. In the second quarter, West Coast worked hard playing against the wind to score two goals to Geelong's one to extend their lead to 27 points at the main break. Geelong were lucky to have that one goal counted to them, as replays showed Mansfield had clearly hit the post with his scoring attempt.
The Eagles further extended their lead to 34 points early in the third quarter when Sumich kicked his fourth. The game had now reached a critical point. Geelong, spurred on by experienced midfielders Bruns, Bairstow and Couch, fought back to cut the margin to 23 points at the last change. However, as they had done the previous week, the Cats let themselves down with poor finishing in front of goal in the final quarter. They drew the margin back to five points with goals to Neeld and Bairstow, but only after kicking seven behinds in the first 15 minutes. West Coast steadied when Sumich kicked his fifth and sixth goals, and when Hart kicked a running goal with little time left on the clock, Geelong's season was over. 
The Eagles, and coach Mick Malthouse, had made it to their first Grand final, and while they had shown they could win tight games under pressure, the fact that they had played two games in the space of six days at AFL Park in difficult conditions had pundits wondering how quickly they would recover for the following week.

Scorecard

Week four (Grand Final)

This marked the first time that  had qualified for the grand final, as well as the first team from outside Victoria.  were appearing in their eighth grand final in nine seasons. They had met previously in the Qualifying final. This would be the first, and only, VFL/AFL grand final to be staged at Waverley Park.

References

Bibliography

External links
 1991 AFL finals on AFL Tables

1991 in Australian rules football
1991 Australian Football League season